is a town in Shimoniikawa District, Toyama Prefecture, Japan. , the town had an estimated population of 25,007 in 8970 households  and a population density of 350 persons per km2.

Geography
With the Sea of Japan to the north, and Kurobe River to the west, Nyūzen is in the center of an alluvial fan. The town is known for its jumbo watermelons, as well as its tulips which became the official town flower in 1983.

Groundwater bubbles forth from various manmade and natural springs in the town. Of special interest is a flat area near the coast the name of which translates to:  where a large volume of flowing spring water has created a rare ecosystem that is protected as a natural monument.

Surrounding municipalities
Toyama Prefecture
Kurobe
Asahi

Climate
The town has a Humid subtropical climate (Köppen Cfa) characterized by hot summers and cold winters with heavy snowfall. The average annual temperature in Nyūzen is 13.6 °C. The average annual rainfall is 2225 mm with September as the wettest month. The temperatures are highest on average in August, at around 26.3 °C, and lowest in January, at around 2.5 °C.

Demographics
Per Japanese census data, the population of Nyūzen has declined in recent decades.

History
The area of present-day Nyūzen was part of ancient Etchū Province. The area was organised as part of Shimoniikawa District, Toyama after the Meiji restoration. The town of Nyūzen was created with merger of seven villages in Shimoniikawa District on October 1, 1953.

Education
Nyūzen has six public elementary schools and two public middle schools operated by the town government, and one public high school operated by the Toyama Prefectural Board of Education.

Transport

Rail
 Ainokaze Toyama Railway Line
   -

Highway
 Hokuriku Expressway

Sister city relations
 Forest Grove, Oregon, United States Since 1989.
 Hami City, Xinjiang, China, friendship city since June 5, 1997.

Local attractions
Jōbenoma Site, ruins of a Heian period shōen, a National Historic Site.

References

External links

  

 
Towns in Toyama Prefecture
Populated coastal places in Japan